"Jos mun pokka pettää" is a Finnish-language song by Finnish pop rock band Haloo Helsinki!. It was released on 13 January 2012 by EMI Music as the fourth and closing single from their third studio album III.

Track listing

Charts

References

External links
 Official music video of "Jos mun pokka pettää" on YouTube

2012 singles
Haloo Helsinki! songs
Finnish-language songs
Songs written by Rauli Eskolin
2012 songs
EMI Records singles